Craig A. Spence (born 17 September 1974) is an Australian professional golfer.

Spence was born in Colac, Victoria and first played golf at the age of 10. Around the age of 15 he began competing at an amateur level. He then went on to the Victorian Institute of Sport, winning two Victorian Amateurs back to back. He turned professional in 1996 and joined the PGA Tour of Australasia.

In 1999 Spence made his professional breakthrough with victory in the Ericsson Australian Masters. Having opened up with a 9 under par first round, he finished by hitting a 6 iron to two feet for a birdie on the final hole to win by a single stroke over Australia's most successful golfer, playing partner Greg Norman. Following that win Spence received invites to tournaments around the world, on five of the major tours. He managed to record top 5 finishes in events on all of those tours.

At the end of 1999, Spence earned his PGA Tour card for the 2000 season with a top 10 finish at the tour's Qualifying School. His rookie year on the PGA Tour was a struggle and he missed out on keeping a full card for 2001, finishing 129th on the money list. He made just two cuts the following season to lose all playing rights on the tour. He spent two more years in the United States competing mostly on mini-tours while receiving invites to a limited number of second tier Nationwide Tour events. He also continued to play on the PGA Tour of Australasia with limited success.

Spence turned his attentions to Europe at the end of 2003, earning a spot on the European Tour for 2004 via the qualifying school. In his début season, he made just three cuts as he failed to keep his card for the 2005 season. He then returned to the United States, to play on the Gateway Tour in preparation for another try at qualifying for the PGA Tour. Having missed out on reaching the final qualifying tournament by one shot in 2006, he and his family moved back to Australia.

Amateur wins
1994 Victorian Amateur Championship
1995 Luxembourg Amateur Championship, Victorian Amateur Championship

Professional wins (2)

PGA Tour of Australasia wins (1)

PGA Tour of Australasia playoff record (0–1)

Other wins (1)
1997 Borrego Springs Open (U.S. mini-tour)

Results in major championships

Note: Spence never played in the Masters Tournament or the PGA Championship.

CUT = Missed the half-way cut

Results in World Golf Championships

Team appearances
Amateur
Australian Men's Interstate Teams Matches (representing Victoria): 1994 (winners), 1995

See also
1999 PGA Tour Qualifying School graduates

References

External links

Australian male golfers
PGA Tour golfers
PGA Tour of Australasia golfers
European Tour golfers
Victorian Institute of Sport alumni
People from Colac, Victoria
Sportsmen from Victoria (Australia)
1974 births
Living people